Dukh Bhanjan Tera Naam (1974) is a Punjabi movie about Sikhism.

Plot
In the era of Guru Ram Das, one cannot leave out Rajni, youngest daughter of Rai Duni Chand, revenue collector (kardar) of Patti. Rajni was a Sikh, a disciple of the Guru. One day she was sitting with her sisters admiring some new clothing they all had received from their father. The girls were ecstatic and exclaiming how good their father was to them. Rajni observed that all gifts are ultimately from God. Their father was merely an instrument of His greatness. Unfortunately for her, he overheard her comment and became very angry.

It was not the first time that she incurred his wrath because of her extreme piety. The infuriated father, believing her to be an ungrateful wretch, married her to a leper with a taunt that he would see how her God would help her lead a normal life. The leper was severely disfigured and a foul smell came from his body. The poor girl had accepted her fate ungrudging and worked hard to maintain herself and her crippled husband. She kept repeating the name of God, and was certain that he was testing her with this turn of events. She was forced to beg for a living. Still she bathed and fed her leper husband, never losing faith. One day, she reached the site of a pool on her way to a neighboring village. Placing the basket containing her husband by the side of the pool, she had gone oft on an errand, most probably to look for food. In the meantime, her crippled husband had seen a black crow dip into the water of the pool and come out white. Amazed at this miracle, the man crawled up to the edge of the pool and managed a dip. He found himself completely cured. When his wife returned, she was amazed to find her husband in good health. He was handsome and whole. At first, she was alarmed and suspected that he might be a different person. He had, however, kept one finger with leprosy marks un-dipped. He showed her the diseased finger as proof of his identity. The couple thanked God, and went to the Guru to seek his blessings.

The pool was the future site of the Golden Temple. The medicinal properties of the water are said to have come Word of God (Gurbani believed as sacred texts by Sikhs). Rajni's leper husband was cured in the pool. Sakhi relates that if one keeps faith in God then one day all rewards are paid. Bibi Rajni had always kept the faith in Guru and God, being happy with whatever she had and thus was rewarded at the end.

Cast
 Dharmendra as Bullcart Driver		
 Dara Singh as Daku Daulay Khan
 Sunil Dutt as Sadhu
 Rajendra Kumar as Boatsman
 Kunwar Mohinder Singh Bedi Sahar as stage pragenter at the biggning the movie 
  Shaminder	as Pingla
 Ranjeet as Daku
 Manmohan Krishna as Sant Faqir
 Johnny Walker as Hakim 
 Om Prakash as Rajguru
 Sunder as Pandit
 Sonia Sahni as Pandtiyan
 Moolchand Lala 
 Goga Kapoor man came to drink water from sunil dutt
  Ram Avtar as Duni chand mantri
   Gopal Saigal as Lutera Sadhu
   V.Gopal as Sadhu
   Khareti as Mukhiya Pandit	
 Radha Saluja as Rajni
   Baby Chintu as young Rajni
   Damyanti Puri as the woman gave cloth to Rajni after ran
 Shoma Anand as Rajni sister 
 D. K. Sapru as Raja Duni Chand
 Veena as Rani Sheela
 Bhushan Tiwari as Ram Lal		
  Nathuram as (Dwarf man Johnny Walker assistant)

Music & Gurbani Shabad
 
S. Mohinder composed the music and Inderjit Hasanpuri and K.Sarshar penned the lyrics while many of the lyrical compositions are taken from the Gurbani (from the Sikh religious text, Guru Granth Sahib). Asha Bhosle, Mohammad Rafi and Suman Kalyanpur are the playback singers.

Babal Phire Var Tolda
Suman Kalyanpur

Main Andle Ki Tek -Asha Bhosle

Jete Samund Sagar Neer Bharya -With Dialogue Mohammed Rafi

Main Andhale Ki Tek -With Dialog Manna Dey,Usha Rege Wrote by Namdev ji

Dukh Bhanjan Tera Naam -With Dialogue Mohammed Rafi

Uth Farida Ooj Saj -
S. Mohinder

Qumbe Badha Jal Rahe-With Dialog Sunil Dutt

O Babla Eh Ki Kehar Kamaya-Mohammed Rafi

Dar Ma De Thande Darbar (With Dialogue)Asha Bhosle

Jo Tud Bhave-With Dialogue Mohammed Rafi

External links
 

1974 films
Punjabi-language Indian films
1970s Punjabi-language films